Josh Webster (born 6 February 1994 in Chelmsford) is a British auto racing driver.

Career
2013 saw Josh drive in the GP3 Series where he finished the season in 28th place scoring no points, with his best finish a pair of 16th places at his home race in Great Britain. For 2014 Josh will be competing in Porsche Carrera Cup Great Britain

Racing Record

Career summary

† As Webster was a guest driver, he was ineligible to score points.
* Season still in progress.

Complete GP3 Series results
(key) (Races in bold indicate pole position) (Races in italics indicate fastest lap)

Complete Porsche Supercup results
(key) (Races in bold indicate pole position) (Races in italics indicate fastest lap)

† Driver did not finish the race, but was classified as he completed over 90% of the race distance.
‡ As Webster was a guest driver, he was ineligible to score points.

References

External links
 
 
 

1994 births
Living people
Sportspeople from Chelmsford
English racing drivers
GP3 Series drivers
Porsche Supercup drivers
International GT Open drivers
Porsche Carrera Cup GB drivers
24H Series drivers

Formula Renault BARC drivers
British Formula Renault 2.0 drivers
WeatherTech SportsCar Championship drivers
Fortec Motorsport drivers
Mark Burdett Motorsport drivers
T-Sport drivers
Status Grand Prix drivers
Walter Lechner Racing drivers
Porsche Carrera Cup Germany drivers